Elachista cinereopunctella is a moth of the family Elachistidae found in Europe.

Description
The wingspan is  The head is grey, face white. Forewings are grey, irrorated with dark fuscous ; a central fascia not reaching dorsum, a spot on tornus, and another on costa close before apex whitish ; a black apical dot. Hindwings are dark grey.The larva is whitish, sides more yellowish ; subdorsal series of red spots ; head dark brown ; 2 with two brown spots.

The larvae feed on Carex digitata, rare spring sedge (Carex ericetorum), glaucous sedge (Carex flacca), dwarf sedge (Carex humilis), Carex ornithopoda, Carex pilosa, tufted hairgrass (Deschampsia cespitosa), melic grass (Melica species) and blue moor-grass (Sesleria caerulea). They mine the leaves of their host plant. The mine generally descends from the leaf tip and may occupy the space between the leaf margin and midrib, but may also occupy the entire width of the leaf. Most frass is deposited in the oldest part of the mine. Pupation takes place outside of the mine. Larvae can be found from late summer to the following spring. The species overwinters within the mine. They are yellowish white with a dark brown head.

Distribution
It is found from Scandinavia and Russia to the Iberian Peninsula and Italy and from Ireland to Poland.

References

cinereopunctella
Leaf miners
Moths described in 1828
Moths of Europe
Taxa named by Adrian Hardy Haworth